Adam Fleischman (born ) is an American restaurateur who founded the Umami Burger chain. He is also the founder and former chief executive officer of the Umami Restaurant Group.

Early life
Fleischman was born in Queens, New York and grew up in Silver Spring, Maryland. He graduated from the University of Maryland with a liberal arts degree. In 1998, he moved to Los Angeles with aspirations of becoming a screenwriter.

Restaurants

In 2009, Fleischman founded Umami Burger in Los Angeles. In 2011, hospitality group sbe acquired a stake of Umami Burger equal to that of Fleischman's, and in 2016, sbe acquired a majority of Umami Restaurant Group. Umami Burger now has over 20 locations, including Orange County, Las Vegas, New York, Chicago, Japan, as well as an Airstream in the Bahamas.

In 2012, Fleischman partnered with chef Anthony Carron to found 800 Degrees Pizza as part of the Umami Restaurant Group. 800 Degrees re-branded to 800 Degrees Woodfired Kitchen in February 2018.

In 2017, Fleischman opened PBJ.LA, which offers a variety of peanut butter and jelly sandwiches, in Grand Central Market in Los Angeles.

References

1970s births
Living people
American restaurateurs
Restaurant founders
American chief executives of food industry companies
Year of birth missing (living people)
21st-century American businesspeople